Karlovy lázně (meaning "Charles' Spa") is a nightclub in Prague, Czech Republic, situated 50 meters from the eastern end of the Charles Bridge on the bank of the Vltava River. The building housing the club was a bath-house dating from the 14th century, and retains some original features, such as mosaic wall tiling and Roman spa-pools now used as dance floors. The club has five floors, with each floor playing a different style of music, a fact which features heavily in the club's marketing.

Karlovy Lázně is the largest club in Prague, and claims to be the largest nightclub complex in Central Europe.

See also

List of electronic dance music venues

References

External links
 
 Karlovy lázně website

Music venues in Prague
Nightclubs in Europe
Electronic dance music venues
1999 establishments in the Czech Republic
Music venues completed in 1999
20th-century architecture in the Czech Republic